Home and Away is an Australian television soap opera that has been broadcast on Channel Seven since 1988. The following is an alphabetical list of all former characters that have been credited as regulars, with the actors who played them. The durations indicate that the character made at least one appearance in every year in that period, not necessarily that they were a main character throughout.

A

B

C

D

F

G

H

J

K

L

M

N

O

P

R

S

T

V

W

See also
 List of Home and Away characters

References

External links
Cast and characters at the official Home and Away website
Cast and characters at Internet Movie Database

Lists of Home and Away characters
Home and Away
Home and Away
H
H